The 2000–01 Argentine Primera División was the 110th season of top-flight football in Argentina. The season ran from July 28, 2000 to July 11, 2001.

Boca Juniors won the Apertura (its 25th league title) and San Lorenzo the Clausura (13th title) championships, while Los Andes and Almagro were relegated after spending only one season in the highest division.

Torneo Apertura

League standings

Top scorers

Torneo Clausura

League standings

Top scorers

Relegation table

Promotion Playoffs 
Belgrano (Córdoba) and Argentinos Juniors (3rd. and 4th. worst averages) played the promotion playoff v Quilmes and Instituto (C) (qualified from 2000–01 Primera B Nacional) respectively, in a two-legged series. 

Although the two playoff series ended 1–1 on aggregate, Argentinos and Belgrano remained in the top division due to rules stated that in cases like those, teams in Primera División would be declared winners (sporting advantage).

See also
2000–01 in Argentine football

Notes

References

Argentine Primera División seasons
2000–01 in Argentine football leagues